Declaration is the seventh studio album by American Christian rock band Red. Originally scheduled for release on April 10, 2020, it was released on April 3, 2020 through the band's independent label Red Entertainment in collaboration with The Fuel Music and was produced by Rob Graves. It is the band's first release on these labels since their departure from Essential Records.

Background and recording
After announcing the band would not be continuing their partnerships with Essential Records and Sony, they announced their future music would be independently funded, recorded, and released. They also announced that touring drummer Dan Johnson will join the band full-time as their fourth member. The band asked fans for support through GoFundMe and originally intended to not release another full-length studio project, focusing on singles and smaller portions of music made at a faster rate. After further thought and discussions with fans, the band decided to record and release a new album, while still utilizing the advantages of quicker music roll-outs that come with independence. The band's former drummer, Joe Rickard, acted as the mixing and mastering engineer on the album, as well as co-writing two songs.

Release and promotion
The band posted an update, via a YouTube video on January 21, 2019. They announced that they are no longer signed to Essential/Sony and they will record their next album independently. They also announced that touring drummer Dan Johnson will join the band full-time as their fourth member, thus making a four-piece lineup since 2014. On June 7, the band released "The Evening Hate", their first new released music since leaving their record label.

After announcing a small run of 10th anniversary tour dates for Innocence & Instinct, the band released another single, "From the Ashes", accompanied by a lyric video, and announced more tour dates. On October 11, the band announced a new EP, The Evening Hate, that would precede a new studio album and would be released November 1, in addition to releasing a new single, "Hemorrhage", a cover of Fuel's song of the same name.

On January 10, 2020, the band announced that their upcoming seventh studio album titled Declaration is set for release on April 10, 2020. On March 25, the band announced that Declaration would be released a week earlier than its original April 10 release date.

Reception

Critical reception

The album generally received critical acclaim from critics who praised the band's return to form and the heavier side of the album.

Jesus Freak Hideout rated the album 4.5 out of 5 stars and stated: "Declaration may just be a new standard for Red. An emotional ballad akin to 'Of These Chains' and 'Hymn for the Missing' would have been a welcome inclusion, but as it stands, this is quite easily the rock album to beat this year. Existing fans will be thrilled and it may even win over a few new converts. However you choose to listen, I highly recommend you do." In his review for Riff magazine, Max Heilman wrote, "These guys could have given in to trends, or at least laid off the classical element, but they know what works best for them. You can't help but buy into the emotional breadth Declaration lays out—from its heaviest breakdowns to the extravagant orchestral sonics—that lays it to rest. Without label constraints to hold it back, it's great to hear Red elevating the post-grunge and nu-metal far beyond expectation." Rock 'N' Load praised the album saying, "A stunning effort from the Nashville outfit, Declaration is an album that should be on everyone's radar. A stellar effort from RED could well be their finest recording to date."

Accolades

Commercial performance
"The Evening Hate" peaked at No. 7 on Billboards Christian Digital Song Sales, "From the Ashes" peaked at No. 15, and "Sever" peaked at No. 21.

Track listing

Personnel
Credits adapted from Tidal.

Red
 Michael Barnes – lead vocals
 Anthony Armstrong – guitars, backing vocals, assistant production
 Randy Armstrong – bass, backing vocals, piano
 Dan Johnson – drums

Additional personnel
 Rob Graves – production
 Joe Rickard – mixing, mastering

Charts

References

2020 albums
Red (American band) albums